Philip Edwin Bujak (born 17 February 1960) is an educationalist and author.  
As CEO of Montessori St Nicholas Charity he was responsible for the founding of the Montessori Schools Association, the Montessori Evaluation and Accreditation Board (designed to identify authentic Montessori schools and improve standards of teaching and management), and was the leading voice in the drive for the creation of state funded Montessori schools.

Early life and teaching 

Born in Attleborough, Norfolk, Bujak attended Attleborough High School where he and his close friend Justin Fashanu were scouted for Norwich City FC in 1974. A good sportsman, he went on to represent Norfolk at football and the Territorial Army at Hockey alongside a lifelong love for cricket.  Bujak taught modern European history at Langley School in Norfolk; having completed his teacher-training at Keswick Hall, Norfolk, after reading Modern European History at the University of East Anglia, 1979–1982. He was Head of History at Langley School from 1983 to 1988, then Head of Lower and Middle School and Boarding Housemaster from 1988 to 1993. In 1993, he became Headmaster of Stover School in Devon remaining Headmaster until 2003. During the 10 years he was Headmaster of Stover, he expanded the school from 120 to 535 pupils, opened Stover Preparatory School in 1998 and created the Millennium Centre opened by HRH The Princess Royal in 2000.

Montessori 

In 2003, Bujak was appointed Chief Executive of the Montessori St Nicholas Charity in London and became responsible for the largest aspect of the Montessori movement across the United Kingdom. In 2005, he founded The Montessori Schools Association, which now comprises approximately 700 Montessori schools; and, in collaboration with Manchester Local Authority, established the first ever state Montessori school at Gorton Mount Primary School. Bujak, speaking to The Guardian, said "I would love to do it for other schools." Between 2005 and 2009, Bujak ran annual residential leadership courses for prospective Headteachers at St Edmund's Hall, University of Oxford and was appointed to the Skills and Crafts Commission on reforming apprenticeships. In 2007 Bujak published Around the World in 100 Years, a celebration of the centenary of the Montessori movement and its worldwide appeal. In 2008, he established The Montessori Evaluation and Accreditation Board which was the only Montessori accreditation scheme in the UK, with 152 leading Montessori schools in membership. Bujak was a leading voice for the need to identify authentic Montessori teaching and to improve teaching standards.

In 2009, he was appointed Managing Director of Montessori Centre International. At that time MCI was in danger of collapse however Bujak expanded MCI into the largest Montessori training college in Europe. In 2012, Bujak led a successful Montessori bid to secure the first Department of Education contract for the Montessori with the Charity providing parenting classes funded by central government in Camden, London. In 2012, Bujak, championed the Montessori Manifesto 2012–2015, launched by Dame Andrea Leadsom at The House of Commons, which was a major national initiative funded by the St Nicholas Charity, to take the Montessori into the most challenged inner-city communities across the UK. In 2013, Bujak expanded the reach of the St Nicholas Charity into Poland with the opening of a new office in Warsaw and the launch of a new online course in Polish. This was the latest of a series of European initiatives sponsored by the St Nicholas Charity. Differences of opinion with Trustees caused Bujak to leave this post in 2014.

Charitable activities 

Between 1993 and 2003 Philip Bujak was an active supporter of The Wooden Spoon and helped to fundraise throughout Devon whilst Headmaster of Stover School.

In 1998 Bujak served on the committee of the MacMillan Appeal for South Devon and was a member of the Devon St Johns Ambulance.

Between 2005–2009, Bujak ran annual residential leadership courses for prospective Headteachers at St Edmund's Hall, Oxford believing that younger academic staff should be encouraged to plan their careers with business leaders as mentors from an early age.

In 2009 and as a commitment to raising awareness of the contribution of the Polish community living in the UK, Philip Bujak co-founded Polish Heritage together with Dr Andrew Meeson. Bujak served as Vice Chairman of The Polish Heritage Society UK in 2009; he assisted in the repair and erection of a statue of Frederyk Chopin at the South Bank Centre (a gift from the people of Poland in the 1970s that had been allowed to fall into disrepair); and supported the placing of a plaque to commemorate the London home of Stanislaw Sosabowski in Chiswick. 

In 2011, in recognition of his work in highlighting the contribution of members of the Polish community in the UK, during and after the Second World War, he was awarded the Pro Memoria Medal by the Republic of Poland. For his fundraising activities he was awarded the Order pro merito Melitensi (cross) by the Sovereign Military Order of Malta and in 2010 he was granted the Freedom of the City of London.

Between 2011 and 2014, Philip Bujak was a committed fundraiser for the charity DEBRA (the fight against Epidermolysis Bullosa) and hosted a charity Opera evening at Stationers' Hall in The City of London featuring soprano Sally Matthews which raised over £10,000.

In 2012, Philip Bujak oversaw the restoration of a portrait of Edward Rydz-Śmigły by the artist, Jan Hawrylkiewicz. This painting was the second of what was a commitment to restore two such artworks a year and followed the restoration of the iconic Battle of Britain painting Return from a Successful Sortie by Artur Horowicz.

In 2013, Philip Bujak led the initiative to place another plaque at 51 New Cavendish Street to mark the London headquarters of the Polish Navy during 1939–1945, unveiled in November 2013 by Witold Sobkow, the Polish Ambassador.

In 2016, a memorial was commissioned by Philip Bujak and his brother and was dedicated to the men of the 3rd Carpathian Division. Over 450 men, including his father, were based at Riddlesworth Resettlement Camp in 1946, and the memorial was unveiled by The Ambassador of The Republic of Poland, Mr Witold Sobkow. The inscription reads:

AFTER THE SECOND WORLD WAR
POLISH SOLDIERS OF THE 3rd.  CARPATHIAN DIVISION
ARRIVED AT RIDDLESWORTH CAMP FROM ITALY
AND LIVED HERE WITH THEIR FAMILIES.
POLAND WAS NOT FREE FOR THEM TO RETURN TO.
THERE ARE STILL MANY POLISH FAMILIES IN THE AREA.
THE DIVISION FOUGHT IN NORTH AFRICA
AND AT MONTE CASSINO, ANCONA AND BOLOGNA.

"It is easy to die for Poland but much harder to suffer for her"
"Jest łatwo stracić życie za Polskę, trudniej za nią cierpieć"

He has been a regional committee member for the National Trust covering Devon & Cornwall, a trustee of the Silvanus Woodland Trust, and Chairman of Governors for Christchurch Primary School in London.

In memory of his father, Philip Bujak set up the J.F. Bujak Trust, to support Sixth Form students at his old Comprehensive school who needed funding to undertake education-based travel around the world.

Publications

His latest book, The Bravest Man in the British Army, published by Pen and Sword Books, appeared in 2018. It adds to his earlier work on the same subject, Undefeated: The Extraordinary Life and Death of Lt. Col. Jack Sherwood-Kelly VC, DSO, CMG published in 2008. In 1990, his history of his hometown Attleborough – The Evolution of a Town was published by Poppyland Press, it builds on his earlier work on the history of the town which appeared in 1988 in Norfolk & Suffolk in The Great War edited by Gerald Gliddon. In 2007 Bujak published Around the World in 100 Years, which was a celebration of the centenary of Montessori and its worldwide appeal. 

Prior to 2018, Bujak wrote, and contributed to, several articles published in The Daily Telegraph, The Independent, The Guardian, Evening Standard, and other publications. He is also a commentator on Anglo-Polish relations and history of the Polish people in the UK. He was a regular contributor to Res Publica and Visegrad Insight – two academic journals published from Warsaw.

In 2019, Philip Bujak won the best newcomer prize in the journalistic section of the Koestler Awards 2019.

Territorial Army
In 1987, Philip Bujak was commissioned as a 2nd lieutenant in the 6th Battalion, The Royal Anglian Regiment (Territorial Army), serving as a platoon commander alongside his teaching career. He went onto serve in the CCF and resigned with the rank of Captain in 1994. In 2022 he was awarded the Centenary Medal of the 4th Bn The Royal Norfolk Regiment.

Father 

His father, Jan Felix Bujak was born in Sytno, Pomorske in northern Poland in 1919. He escaped from Nazi occupied Europe and joined the Free Polish Army in Italy, serving with the 3rd Heavy Machine Gun Battalion, 3rd Carpathian Division, 2nd Corps, at the battle of Monte Cassino. He was awarded the Krzyz Walecznych (Cross of Valour) and the Monte Cassino Cross. His father also fought in the battles for Ancona and Bologna in 1944 - 1945 and his battalion was credited with the taking of Monte della Crescia in July 1944. He was also the regimental chess champion and spoke five languages.

Personal life 

Philip Bujak is a former Liveryman of the Worshipful Company of Gardeners and a former Freeman of the Worshipful Company of Educators. Due to a deteriorating heart condition and eventual heart failure, Bujak stepped down from his professional and public roles in 2014. In private life he remained dedicated to recording the history of Polish people in post War Britain and promoting the contribution of the Polish community living in the UK.

Bujak lodged a Personal Injury Claim against the Montessori St Nicholas Charity in 2015 but after three trials lasting 15 weeks (the first having collapsed due to the sudden death of his co-defendant), in July 2018 Bujak was imprisoned for six years by a judge at Southwark Crown Court, having been found guilty of fraud. His latest books are a revisionist biography of Marcus Tullius Cicero to be published by Pen & Sword Books in October 2023 and a biography of the Scottish landscape artist Archibald Kay to be published in March 2023.

His eldest daughter is the climate and republican activist Gully Bujak.

References 

1960 births
Living people
Alumni of the University of East Anglia
British corporate directors
British educational theorists
Military personnel from Norfolk
People from Reigate
Royal Anglian Regiment soldiers
Royal Anglian Regiment officers
British people of Polish descent